The Catalonia rugby union team is the national and/or representative rugby union team of Catalonia. It is organised by the Catalan Rugby Federation and has been active since 1923. On 14 April 1934 they made their international debut with a 5–5 draw at the Camp de Les Corts against Italy.

History
During the early 1930s they played against various French club and provincial teams. In 1930 they also twice played a visiting Royal Navy XV and also embarked on brief tour of Germany. In March 1934 Catalonia became a founding member of the Fédération Internationale de Rugby Amateur and on 14 April 1934 they made their international debut with a 5–5 draw at the Camp de Les Corts against Italy. On 27 May 1934 Catalonia played their first international against France, losing 15–22. After the Spanish Civil War, Catalonia lost its sporting independence. This saw the Catalan Rugby Federation lose its full membership of FIRA and the right to organise full international games. Despite these restrictions, the Catalonia national rugby union team continues to play friendlies against international teams as well as club and provincial teams. The Catalan Rugby Federation has also campaigned for its full membership of Rugby Europe to be restored, citing founding members rights of FIRA (now Rugby Europe) and comparing their stance to that of England, Scotland, and Wales, who do not compete in a unified Great Britain team, but rather as individual entities and founding members of the IRB (now World Rugby).

Matches

Internationals

Notes

Spanish Regions Championship finals
Since 1983–84 Catalonia have competed in the Spanish Regions Championship, featuring other teams, such as the Basque Country, representing the autonomous communities of Spain. This competition is organised by the Spanish Rugby Federation.

Honours
Spanish Regions Championship
Winners: 1987–88, 1988–89, 1990–91, 1991–92, 1999–2000: 5
Runners-up: 1983–84, 1984–85, 1985–86, 1989–90, 1993–94, 1995–96, 1996–97, 1997–98: 8

2010 squad 

Catalonia vs. Sweden (2010)

Catalan qualified players who represented other qualified international teams

Men's internationals
 (1934–1941)

(C&S:this players represented the Catalonia and the Spain rugby team)

(C&S:this players represented the Catalonia and the Spain rugby team)

Women's internationals

References

See also
Rugby union in Catalonia

International rugby union teams
1923 establishments in Spain
European national rugby union teams
Rugby union
Rugby union in Catalonia